Dezső Kalinovszky (born 6 June 1933 in Cluj, died 19 December 2009 in Cluj-Napoca) was a Romanian writer of Hungarian ethnicity. He studied technology in Odessa and worked at Babeș-Bolyai University.

Works
A pokoli pulóver és más ördöngösségek, porjunulara romano, Kvár, 1972;
Szemenszedett igazság. Skizoj, humurajxoj, Kvár, 1975.

References

External links
Erdélyi Magyar Írók Ligája

1933 births
2009 deaths
Academic staff of Babeș-Bolyai University
Romanian people of Hungarian descent